The High Technology Theft Apprehension and Prosecution Program, abbreviated as the HTTAP Program, is a program within the California Emergency Management Agency (CalEMA) concerned with high technology crime including white-collar crime, cracking, computerized money laundering, theft of services, copyright infringement of software, remarking and counterfeiting of computer hardware and
software, and industrial espionage.

High Technology Crime Advisory Committee 

The High Technology Crime Advisory Committee was "established for the purpose of formulating a comprehensive written strategy for addressing high technology crime throughout the state" and is composed of the following individuals appointed by the CalEMA Secretary:

 a designee of the California District Attorneys Association
 a designee of the California State Sheriffs Association
 a designee of the California Police Chiefs Association
 a designee of the California Attorney General
 a designee of the California Highway Patrol
 a designee of the High Technology Crime Investigation Association
 a designee of the California Emergency Management Agency
 a designee of the American Electronics Association to represent California computer system manufacturers
 a designee of the American Electronics Association to represent California computer software producers
 a designee of CTIA - The Wireless Association
 a representative of the California Internet industry
 a designee of the Semiconductor Equipment and Materials International
 a designee of the California Cable & Telecommunications Association
 a designee of the Motion Picture Association of America
 a designee of the California Communications Associations (CalCom)
 a representative of the California banking industry
 a representative of the California Office of Information Security and Privacy Protection
 a representative of the California Department of Finance
 a representative of the California State Chief Information Officer
 a representative of the Recording Industry Association of America
 a representative of the Consumers Union

Task Forces 

The program is implemented by funding and supporting independent regional task forces:

 the Computer and Technology Crime High-Tech Response Team (CATCH) of the San Diego County District Attorney's Office
 the Northern California Computer Crimes Task Force (NC3TF) of the Marin County District Attorney's Office
 the Rapid Enforcement Allied Computer Team (REACT) of the Santa Clara County District Attorney's Office
 the Southern California High Tech Task Force (SCHTTF) of the Los Angeles County Sheriff's Department
 the Sacramento Valley Hi-Tech Crimes Task Force (SVHTCTF) of the Sacramento County Sheriff's Department

References

External links 
 Rapid Enforcement Allied Computer Team (REACT) task force
 Sacramento Valley Hi-Tech Crimes Task Force (SVHTCTF)

State law enforcement agencies of California
Year of establishment missing